Season 1885–86 was the 10th season in which Hibernian competed at a Scottish national level, entering the Scottish Cup for the 9th time.

Overview 

Hibs reached the semi – final of the Scottish Cup, losing 2–0 to Renton

Results 

All results are written with Hibs' score first.

Scottish Cup

See also
List of Hibernian F.C. seasons

Notes

External links 
 Results For Season 1886/1887 in All Competitions, www.ihibs.co.uk

Hibernian F.C. seasons
Hibernian